Jackie McNamara (born 24 October 1973) is a Scottish professional football agent, and former player, manager and executive. He won 33 international caps playing for Scotland, and filled a variety of defensive roles in his career.

McNamara began his playing career with Dunfermline Athletic before joining Celtic in 1995. During ten years at the club he won the Scottish Premier League title four times and the Scottish Cup and Scottish League Cup three times each. He then played in England with Wolverhampton Wanderers before returning to Scotland, finishing his career with spells at Aberdeen, Falkirk and Partick Thistle.

In international football, McNamara played for Scotland at under-21 and B international levels, and made 33 full international appearances. He was a member of the Scotland squad that played at the 1998 FIFA World Cup.

McNamara moved into management with Partick Thistle in April 2011, before his appointment at Dundee United in January 2013. He was sacked by Dundee United in September 2015, and two months later took over as manager of York City. He then worked as chief executive at York City. He is currently working with Dunfermline Athletic as a consultant.

Early life
McNamara was born at Glasgow Royal Maternity Hospital in Glasgow and is the son of Jackie McNamara Sr., a former professional footballer, and Linda Houston. He played youth football for Cumbernauld Colts and Falkirk-based Gairdoch United.

Club career

Dunfermline Athletic
McNamara joined Dunfermline Athletic from Gairdoch United on 17 September 1991.

Celtic
McNamara moved to Celtic for a £600,000 fee on 3 October 1995. He made an impressive start to his Celtic career, being named PFA Scotland Young Player of the Year in 1996. McNamara won his first trophy with the club in the 1997–98 season when Celtic won the Scottish Premier Division, preventing arch-rivals Rangers from winning ten-in-a-row, which would have seen them eclipse Celtic's record of nine-in-a-row. He was recognised for his performances this season by his fellow players when being named the PFA Scotland Players' Player of the Year in 1998. He featured regularly in the Celtic first eleven until the arrival of Martin O'Neill in the 2000–01 season saw him become more of a fringe player, although he did score the opening goal in the 2001 Scottish Cup Final, a 3–0 win over Hibernian at Hampden Park. He was suspended for their 3–0 victory over Kilmarnock at Hampden Park in the 2001 Scottish League Cup Final.

McNamara re-established himself in the team in 2003–04 and was awarded the SFWA Footballer of the Year in 2004, beating off competition from his teammates Henrik Larsson and Chris Sutton. The following year McNamara was named captain when Paul Lambert was injured. McNamara proved himself a consistent and reliable performer on the field, playing almost every game in the league in the 2004–05 season. To reward his loyalty to the club over a ten-year period, Celtic played a testimonial match against the Republic of Ireland. At the end of the 2004–05 season Martin O'Neill left as manager and Celtic brought in Gordon Strachan as his replacement.

McNamara's contract was also due to expire at the end of the 2004–05 season. Strachan assured McNamara that he wanted him at the club but Celtic were slow to offer a new contract, waiting until the close season to do so. By that time McNamara had already accepted an offer from Wolverhampton Wanderers as he had assumed Celtic no longer wanted his services. As he went on record saying he still wanted to play for the club, he was told he was still needed by the club by its manager, and he was offered the contract he wanted while still in a position to accept it, the incident has caused much speculation amongst supporters and the media as to who was to blame for his departure from Celtic. The club accused McNamara of being unreasonable and of moving for monetary reasons. They also blamed his agent for not encouraging negotiations and setting unhelpful deadlines.

McNamara had gone on record as saying he wanted to end his career with Celtic and seemed to be bemused when no new contract was forthcoming. After he had accepted the Wolves offer, McNamara felt that Celtic showed a lack of respect to him in their comments to the media and he accused them of harming his reputation for their own benefit. It also emerged that in his new contract at Wolves, he was earning the same wages as his previous contract with Celtic.

Wolverhampton Wanderers
McNamara agreed with manager Glenn Hoddle that he would join Wolverhampton Wanderers in the summer of 2005 on a free transfer. After a promising start to his Wolves career, the player sustained a cruciate knee ligament injury in the home match with Leicester City in September 2005. He came back in the penultimate game of the 2005–06 season at home to Brighton & Hove Albion. McNamara was a regular fixture in the 2006–07 Wolves team who finished 5th in the Football League Championship, reaching the play-offs.

Aberdeen
McNamara joined Aberdeen from Wolves on a two-year contract in May 2007, but he left Pittodrie before the end of the season, with manager Jimmy Calderwood citing "travelling and injuries" as the reasons for his departure. Three weeks later, it was revealed that McNamara would join Falkirk for the 2008–09 season.

Falkirk
McNamara signed a two-year contract at Falkirk in May 2008.

Partick Thistle
McNamara signed a one-month loan deal with Partick Thistle in February 2010, making him available to debut the following day against Dundee if selected. The terms of the deal allowed it to be extended beyond its initial period, but McNamara suffered a leg break during a match against Ayr United, prematurely ending his 2009–10 season. McNamara subsequently signed a one-year contract with Thistle for the 2010–11 season, which then continued on a one-year rolling contract basis.

International career

Under-21
McNamara made his debut for the Scotland national under-21 team in a 2–1 away win over Greece on 13 December 1994, in a 1996 UEFA European Under-21 Championship qualifier. His first goal came in the reverse fixture, a 3–0 home win on 15 August 1995. McNamara finished his under-21 career with 12 caps and one goal, earned between 1994 and 1996.

Senior
McNamara was capped once by the B team, in a 3–0 away defeat to Denmark on 23 April 1996, before making his debut for the senior team in a 2–0 away win over Latvia in a 1998 FIFA World Cup qualifier on 5 October 1996. He was selected for the Scotland squad in the 1998 FIFA World Cup. He did not feature in the opening match, a 2–1 defeat against defending champions Brazil in Paris. His introduction from the bench in Scotland's second match, against Norway in Bordeaux, was seen as pivotal in wiping out a one-goal deficit. The game finished in a 1–1 draw, leaving Scotland with a chance of qualification to the knockout stages. Ultimately the efforts were futile as Morocco were victorious in St Etienne with a 3–0 win in the final match and Norway managed to qualify from the group with a win against Brazil. McNamara earned 33 caps for Scotland between 1996 and 2005.

Managerial career

Partick Thistle
McNamara began his managerial career at Partick Thistle where he was appointed caretaker manager on 15 April 2011, after Ian McCall left his job. He was then appointed manager on a one-year rolling contract a month later. Thistle performed well in his second season as manager, reaching the Challenge Cup final and lying in second place in the First Division in late January 2013. At this point he left Thistle to take the vacant position at SPL club Dundee United. McNamara was replaced at Partick Thistle by Alan Archibald, a former Thistle and Dundee United defender.

Dundee United
McNamara's first match in charge of his new club was a fifth round Scottish Cup tie with Third Division Rangers on 2 February 2013. United won 3–0, with Johnny Russell putting the home side ahead in the first minute of the match. The following week United defeated Hearts 3–1 in McNamara's first Scottish Premier League match as manager of the side. It was the side's first league win at home since August 2012. On 24 February 2014, McNamara extended his contract with Dundee United until 2017.

McNamara's first full season at Tannadice saw United reach the Scottish Cup Final, which his side lost 2–0 to St Johnstone. The following season United lost the League Cup Final to Celtic, 2–0. The latter few months of that season also saw a sharp dip in United's form following the sale in January 2015 of Gary Mackay-Steven and Stuart Armstrong.

Reports following Dundee United's 2–1 defeat to St Johnstone on 26 September 2015 suggested McNamara had been relieved of his duties, which was confirmed by the club two days later.

York City

McNamara was appointed manager of League Two club York City on 4 November 2015, and his first match in charge came three days later, with a 3–2 away defeat to Accrington Stanley in the FA Cup first round. In April 2016, York's relegation from the Football League was confirmed by a 3–0 defeat against Accrington. In October 2016, a 6–1 defeat against the division's bottom club, Guiseley, left York in 20th place in the National League.

Following talks between McNamara and the club, York announced the manager would resign if they failed to gain a "positive result" in their next match, against Braintree Town. Following a 1–1 draw in that match, McNamara announced he would be stepping down, but had agreed to stay on as manager until a replacement was found. When Gary Mills was reappointed manager on 16 October 2016, McNamara took on the role of chief executive at the club. He left this position in March 2018.

Return to Dunfermline Athletic
In January 2019, McNamara returned to Scottish football as a consultant at previous club Dunfermline Athletic.

Personal life
McNamara co-wrote a television sitcom pilot with Scottish actor and comedy writer Fran Gilhooley called The Therapy Room, starring Jackie's actor brother, Donny. The show is based around a young footballer who is catapulted from amateur football to the English top flight, and is partly based around McNamara's own experiences as a player and manager.

McNamara was taken to the intensive care unit of Hull Royal Infirmary in February 2020, after he collapsed near his home in York, having suffered a brain hemorrhage. His condition was described at one point as "critical but stable", but after a few weeks of care he was able to return home.

Career statistics

Club

International

Managerial statistics

Honours

Player
Celtic
Scottish Premier Division/Scottish Premier League: 1997–98, 2000–01, 2001–02, 2003–04
Scottish Cup: 2000–01, 2003–04, 2004–05; runner-up: 2001–02
Scottish League Cup: 1997–98, 1999–2000; runner-up: 2002–03
UEFA Cup runner-up: 2002–03

Falkirk
Scottish Cup runner-up: 2008–09

Individual
PFA Scotland Young Player of the Year: 1996
PFA Scotland Players' Player of the Year: 1998
SFWA Footballer of the Year: 2004

Manager
Dundee United
Scottish Cup runner-up: 2013–14
Scottish League Cup runner-up: 2014–15

See also
List of Scotland national football team captains
List of Scottish football families

References

External links

1973 births
Living people
Footballers from Glasgow
Scottish footballers
Scotland under-21 international footballers
Scotland B international footballers
Scotland international footballers
Association football defenders
Dunfermline Athletic F.C. players
Celtic F.C. players
Wolverhampton Wanderers F.C. players
Aberdeen F.C. players
Falkirk F.C. players
Partick Thistle F.C. players
Scottish Football League players
Scottish Premier League players
English Football League players
1998 FIFA World Cup players
Scottish football managers
Partick Thistle F.C. managers
Dundee United F.C. managers
York City F.C. managers
Scottish Football League managers
Scottish Premier League managers
Scottish Professional Football League managers
English Football League managers
National League (English football) managers
Association football executives
Dunfermline Athletic F.C. non-playing staff